Sparganothis tristriata, the three-streaked sparganothis moth, is a species of moth of the family Tortricidae. It is found in North America, including Alberta, Connecticut, Florida, Indiana, Kentucky, Maine, Manitoba, Maryland, Massachusetts, Minnesota, Mississippi, New Hampshire, New Jersey, New York, North Carolina, Ohio, Oklahoma, Ontario, Quebec, 
Saskatchewan, South Carolina, Tennessee and Wisconsin.

The wingspan is 16–20 mm.

References

Moths described in 1884
Sparganothis